is a Japanese football player. He plays for Tegevajaro Miyazaki.

Career
Hiroki Okuda joined Japanese Regional Leagues club Igosso Kochi FC (later; Kochi United SC) in 2015. In 2017, he moved to J3 League club YSCC Yokohama.

Club statistics
Updated to 22 February 2020.

References

External links

Profile at Gainare Tottori

1992 births
Living people
Meiji University alumni
Association football people from Osaka Prefecture
Japanese footballers
J3 League players
Japan Football League players
YSCC Yokohama players
Gainare Tottori players
Tegevajaro Miyazaki players
Association football defenders